A Thief Has Arrived (Spanish:Ha entrado un ladrón) is a 1940 Argentine film directed by Augusto Cesar Vatteone. It was based on a novel by Wenceslao Fernández Flórez. It was remade in 1950 as a Spanish film.

Cast
 Ana Arneodo 
 Nélida Bilbao 
 Emperatriz Carvajal 
 Vicente Forastieri 
 Antonio Gandía 
 Elisa Labardén 
 Tito Lusiardo
 Domingo Márquez
 Julio Renato 
 Leonor Rinaldi 
 Carlos Rosingana
 Francisco Álvarez

References

Bibliography 
 Goble, Alan. The Complete Index to Literary Sources in Film. Walter de Gruyter, 1999.

External links 
 

1940 films
1940s Spanish-language films
Films directed by Augusto César Vatteone
Films scored by Alejandro Gutiérrez del Barrio
Argentine black-and-white films
1940s Argentine films